Boogity, Boogity – A Tribute to the Comic Genius of Ray Stevens is a tribute album recorded by country music singer/parodist Cledus T. Judd. It contains Judd's renditions of twelve songs previously recorded by country music artist Ray Stevens, largely with duet partners. Stevens himself is featured on the cover of "The Streak". "Gitarzan", featuring former Trick Pony lead vocalist Heidi Newfield, was the only single released from this project.

History 
The album was originally slated for release on Koch Records on October 4, 2005. However, Koch closed its Nashville division, and the album was ultimately issued by Asylum-Curb Records on August 28, 2007.

Track listing

Personnel 

 Robert Bailey – background vocals
 Bruce Bouton – Dobro, steel guitar
 Mark Casstevens – banjo, harmonica
 Chris Clark – sound effects, vocal effects
 Kim Fleming – background vocals
 Rob Hajacos – fiddle
 Vicki Hampton – background vocals
 Wes Hightower – background vocals
 John Hobbs – piano
 Jim Horn – baritone saxophone, trombone, horn arrangements
 David Hungate – bass guitar
 John Barlow Jarvis – piano
 Cledus T. Judd – lead vocals, sound effects
 Paul Leim – drums
 Brent Mason – electric guitar
 Steve Patrick – trumpet
 Chuck Rhodes – whistle
 Michael Spriggs – acoustic guitar

Guest musicians 
 Lead guitar on "Gitarzan": Keith Urban
 Guest vocals on "Everything Is Beautiful": Michael English, Erika Jo, Dobie Gray, Andy Griggs, Wynonna Judd, Rascal Flatts, Julie Roberts, SHeDAISY, Phil Vassar, Darryl Worley
 Children's chorus on "Everything Is Beautiful": Paul Hogan, Jacob Kinslow, Abbie Page, Sharon Shelton, Grace Sturgeon

Chart performance

References 

2007 albums
Cledus T. Judd albums
Asylum-Curb Records albums
Tribute albums
2000s comedy albums